This is a list of decapod crustaceans found in the North and South Atlantic Oceans.

Dendrobranchiata

Acetes americanus
Artemesia longinaris
Aristaeomorpha foliacea
Farfantepenaeus aztecus
Farfantepenaeus brasiliensis
Farfantepenaeus duorarum
Farfantepenaeus notialis – Southern pink shrimp
Farfantepenaeus paulensis
Hadropenaeus affinis
Hadropenaeus modestus
Litopenaeus schmitti
Litopenaeus setiferus
Lucifer faxoni
Lucifer typus
Mesopenaeus tropicalis
Metapenaeopsis goodei
Parapenaeus americanus
Parapenaeus politus
Peisos petrunkevitchi
Penaeopsis serrata
Pleoticus muelleri
Pleoticus robustus
Philocheras gorei
Plesionika edwardsii
Plesionika martia
Plesionika tenuipes
Plesionika willisi
Rimapenaeus constrictus
Sicyonia brevirostris
Sicyonia burkenroadi
Sicyonia dorsalis
Sicyonia laevigata
Sicyonia laevigata
Sicyonia parri
Sicyonia parri
Sicyonia stimpsoni
Sicyonia typica
Solenocera atlantidis
Solenocera necopina
Solenocera vioscai
Xiphopenaeus kroyeri

Caridea

Alpheus angulosus
Alpheus armillatus
Alpheus estuariensis
Alpheus formosus
Alpheus heterochaelis
Alpheus intrinsecus
Alpheus normanni
Anchistioides antiguensis
Automate dolichognatha
Automate evermanni
Brachycarpus biunguiculatus
Bythocaris nana
Crangon crangon
Crangon septemspinosa
Discias atlanticus
Discias vernbergi
Exhippolysmata oplophoroides
Gnathophyllum modestum
Heterocarpus ensifer
Hippolyte coerulescens
Hippolyte obliquimanus
Hippolyte pleuracanthus
Hippolyte zostericola
Latreutes fucorum
Latreutes parvulus
Leander tenuicornis
Leptalpheus forceps
Leptochela bermudensis
Leptochela carinata
Leptochela papulata
Leptochela serratorbita
Lysmata intermedia
Lysmata rathbunae
Lysmata wurdemanni
Macrobrachium acanthurus
Macrobrachium carcinus
Macrobrachium ohione
Macrobrachium olfersii
Merhippolyte americana
Neopontonides beaufortensis
Nikoides schmitti
Ogyrides alphaerostris
Ogyrides hayi
Palaemon serratus
Palaemonetes intermedius
Palaemonetes pugio
Palaemonetes vulgaris
Pandalus borealis
Pantomus parvulus
Periclimenaeus ascidiarum
Periclimenaeus atlanticus
Periclimenaeus schmitti
Periclimenaeus wilsoni
Periclimenes americanus
Periclimenes iridescens
Periclimenes longicaudatus
Periclimenes pedersoni
Periclimenes yucatanicus – spotted cleaner shrimp
Pontonia domestica
Pontonia manningi
Pontophilus brevirostris
Processa bermudensis
Processa guyanae
Processa hemphilli
Processa profunda
Processa tenuipes
Processa vicina
Synalpheus apioceros
Synalpheus fritzmuelleri
Synalpheus longicarpus
Synalpheus minus
Synalpheus pectiniger
Synalpheus townsendi
Thor dobkini
Thor floridanus
Thor manningi
Tozeuma carolinense
Tozeuma serratum
Trachycaris rugosa
Typton vulcanus
Xiphocaris elongata

Stenopodidea

Stenopus hispidus
Stenopus scutellatus

Spiny lobsters and allies

Arctides guineensis
Jasus lalandii – Cape rock lobster
Jasus tristani – Tristan rock lobster
Justitia longimanus
Palinurellus gundlachi
Palinurus charlestoni
Palinurus elephas – European spiny lobster
Palinurus mauritanicus
Palinustus truncatus
Panulirus argus
Panulirus echinatus
Panulirus guttatus
Panulirus laevicauda
Panulirus regius
Parribacus antarcticus
Projasus parkeri
Scyllarides aequinoctialis
Scyllarides brasiliensis
Scyllarides deceptor
Scyllarides delfosi
Scyllarides herklotsii
Scyllarides latus
Scyllarides nodifer
Scyllarus americanus
Scyllarus arctus
Scyllarus chacei
Scyllarus depressus
Scyllarus pygmaeus

Axiidea and Gebiidea

Acanthaxius hirsutimanus
Axius armatus
Axius serratus
Biffarius biformis
Biffarius fragilis
Calaxius jenneri
Callianassa subterranea
Calliapagurops charcoti
Callichirus major
Calocaris templemani
Cheramus marginatus
Gilvossius setimanus
Lepidophthalmus turneranus
Naushonia crangonoides
Necallianassa berylae
Paraxiopsis gracilimana
Pestarella tyrrhena
Upogebia affinis
Upogebia deltaura
Upogebia pusilla
Vulcanocalliax arutyunovi

Lobsters

Acanthacaris caeca
Eunephrops bairdii
Eunephrops cadenasi
Eunephrops manningi
Homarus americanus – American lobster
Homarus gammarus – European lobster
Metanephrops binghami – Caribbean lobster
Metanephrops rubellus
Nephropides caribaeus
Nephrops norvegicus – Norway lobster
Nephropsis aculeata
Nephropsis agassizii
Nephropsis atlantica
Nephropsis neglecta
Nephropsis rosea
Thaumastocheles zaleucus
Thymops birsteini
Thymopsis nilenta

Hermit crabs and allies

Albunea catherinae
Albunea gibbesii
Anisopagurus hopkinsi
Cancellus ornatus
Catapagurus sharreri
Clibanarius erythropus
Clibanarius tricolor
Clibanarius vittatus
Dardanus fucosus
Dardanus insignis
Diogenes pugilator – Small hermit crab
Emerita benedicti
Emerita talpoida – Atlantic sand crab
Euceramus praelongus
Eumunida picta
Galathea intermedia
Galathea rostrata
Galathea strigosa
Goreopagurus piercei
Hemipagurus gracilis
Iridopagurus reticulates
Lepidopa websteri
Lithodes maja – Norway king crab
Loxopagurus loxochelis
Manucomplanus ungulatus
Megalobrachium soriatum
Munida angulata
Munida forceps
Munida iris
Munida irrasa
Munida longipes
Munida pusilla
Munida spinifrons
Munida valida
Pachycheles pilosus
Pachycheles rugimanus
Paguristes hummi
Paguristes lymani
Paguristes moorei
Paguristes sericeus
Paguristes spinipes
Paguristes tortugae
Paguristes triangulatus
Pagurus acadianus
Pagurus annulipes
Pagurus bernhardus – European hermit crab
Pagurus brevidactylus
Pagurus carolinensis
Pagurus defensus
Pagurus impressus
Pagurus longicarpus – long-clawed hermit crab
Pagurus maclaughlinae
Pagurus politus
Pagurus pollicaris – flat-clawed hermit crab
Pagurus prideaux
Pagurus stimpsoni
Paralithodes platypus – blue king crab
Paralomis africana
Parapagurus pilosimanus
Petrochirus diogenes
Petrolisthes armatus
Petrolisthes galathinus
Phimochirus holthuisi
Pisidia longicornis
Polyonyx gibbesi
Porcellana platycheles
Porcellana sayana
Porcellana sigsbeiana
Pylopagurus discoidalis
Rhodochirus rosaceus
Sympagurus pictus
Tomopaguropsis problematica
Tomopagurus cokeri
Tomopagurus wassi

Crabs

Acanthilia intermedia
Acanthocarpus alexandri
Achaeus cranchii
Aepinus septemspinosus
Allactea lithostrota
Anasimus latus
Anomalothir furcillatus
Arachnopsis filipes
Arenaeus cribrarius
Armases cinereum
Atelecyclus rotundatus – circular crab
Atelecyclus undecimdentatus
Austinixa cristata
Bathynectes longipes
Bathynectes longispina
Bathynectes maravigna
Batrachonotus fragosus
Bellia picta
Calappa flammea
Calappa ocellata
Calappa sulcata
Calappa tortugae
Callidactylus asper
Callinectes bocourti
Callinectes danae
Callinectes exasperatus
Callinectes larvatus
Callinectes marginatus – sharptooth swimcrab
Callinectes ornatus
Callinectes sapidus – blue crab
Callinectes similis
Cancer bellianus
Cancer borealis – Jonah crab
Cancer irroratus – Atlantic rock crab
Cancer pagurus – edible crab
Carcinus maenas – European shore crab
Cardisoma guanhumi – blue land crab
Carpoporus papulosus
Celatopesia concava
Chaceon fenneri – golden crab
Clythrocerus granulatus
Clythrocerus nitidus
Coelocerus spinosus
Collodes robustus
Collodes trispinosus
Corystes cassivelaunus
Cronius ruber
Cronius tumidulus
Cryptosoma balguerii
Cyclozodion tuberatum
Deilocerus perpusillus
Dissodactylus crinitichelis
Dissodactylus mellitae
Domecia acanthophora
Dorhynchus thomsoni
Dromia erythropus
Dromia personata
Dyspanopeus sayi
Dyspanopeus texanus
Ebalia cariosa
Ebalia cranchii
Ebalia stimpsonii
Ebalia tuberosa
Ebalia tumefacta
Epialtus bituberculatus
Epialtus dilatatus
Eriphia gonagra
Eriphia verrucosa
Ethusa americana
Ethusa microphthalma
Ethusa tenuipes
Euchirograpsus americanus
Euprognatha rastellifera
Eurynome aspera
Eurynome spinosa
Eurypanopeus abbreviatus
Eurypanopeus depressus
Euryplax nitida
Eurytium limosum
Frevillea hirsuta
Gemmotheres chamae
Geryon tridens
Glyptoplax smithii
Glyptoxanthus erosus
Goneplax rhomboides
Goneplax sigsbei
Hemigrapsus penicillatus
Hemus cristulipes
Hepatus epheliticus
Hepatus pudibundus
Heterocrypta granulata
Hexapanopeus angustifrons
Hexapanopeus paulensis
Homola barbata
Homola minima
Hyas araneus – great spider crab
Hyas coarctatus
Hypoconcha arcuata
Hypoconcha parasitica
Hypoconcha spinosissima
Iliacantha subglobosa
Inachoides forceps
Inachus dorsettensis – scorpion spider crab
Inachus leptochirus
Inachus phalangium
Latreillia elegans
Libinia dubia
Libinia emarginata – portly spider crab
Liocarcinus corrugatus
Liocarcinus depurator
Liocarcinus holsatus
Liocarcinus marmoreus – marbled swimming crab
Liocarcinus navigator
Liocarcinus pusillus
Liocarcinus vernalis – vernal crab
Lobopilumnus agassizii
Lysirude nitidus
Macrocoeloma camptocerum
Macrocoeloma eutheca
Macrocoeloma septemspinosum
Macrocoeloma trispinosum
Macropipus tuberculatus
Macropodia deflexa
Macropodia linaresi
Macropodia parva
Macropodia rostrata
Macropodia tenuirostris
Maja squinado – European spider crab
Melybia thalamita
Menippe adina – Gulf stone crab
Menippe mercenaria – Florida stone crab
Menippe nodifrons
Mesorhoea sexspinosa
Metoporhaphis calcarata
Micropanope nuttingi
Micropanope pusilla
Micropanope sculptipes
Micropanope urinator
Microphrys antillensis
Microphrys bicornutus
Mithraculus forceps
Mithraculus sculptus
Mithrax cornutus
Mithrax hispidus
Mithrax spinosissimus
Mithrax verrucosus
Monodaeus couchi
Moreiradromia antillensis
Myropsis quinquespinosa
Nanoplax xanthiformis
Necora puber – velvet crab
Neopanope packardii – Florida grassflat crab
Neopilumnoplax americana
Nibilia antilocapra
Ocypode quadrata – Atlantic ghost crab
Osachila semilevis
Osachila tuberosa
Ovalipes ocellatus – lady crab
Ovalipes stephensoni
Pachygrapsus transversus
Palicus alternatus
Palicus faxoni
Palicus sica
Panopeus herbstii – Atlantic mud crab
Panopeus obesus
Panopeus occidentalis
Panoplax depressa
Paractaea rufopunctata
Parapinnixa bouvieri
Parapinnixa hendersoni
Paromola cuvieri
Parthenope agona
Pelia mutica
Percnon gibbesi
Persephona mediterranea
Pilumnus dasypodus
Pilumnus floridanus
Pilumnus hirtellus
Pilumnus lacteus
Pilumnus pannosus
Pilumnus sayi
Pilumnus spinifer
Pinnaxodes floridensis
Pinnixa chaetopterana
Pinnixa cylindrica
Pinnixa floridana
Pinnixa lunzi
Pinnixa retinens
Pinnixa sayana
Pinnotheres pinnotheres
Pinnotheres pisum – pea crab
Pirimela denticulata
Pisa armata
Pisa tetraodon
Pitho lherminieri
Plagusia depressa
Planes minutus
Platylambrus fraterculus
Platylambrus granulata
Platylambrus pourtalesii
Platylambrus serratus
Podochela gracilipes
Podochela riisei
Podochela sidneyi
Polybius henslowii
Portumnus latipes
Portunus anceps
Portunus depressifrons
Portunus floridanus
Portunus gibbesii
Portunus ordwayi
Portunus sayi
Portunus spinicarpus
Achelous spinimanus
Portunus ventralis
Pseudomedaeus agassizii
Pseudomedaeus distinctus
Pyromaia arachna
Pyromaia cuspidata
Ranilia constricta
Ranilia muricata
Raninoides loevis
Rhithropanopeus harrisii – white-tipped mud crab
Rochinia crassa
Rochinia tanneri
Rochinia umbonata
Sesarma reticulatum – heavy marsh crab
Solenolambrus tenellus
Solenolambrus typicus
Speloeophorus elevatus
Speloeophorus nodosus
Speloeophorus pontifer
Speocarcinus carolinensis – Carolinian squareback crab
Sphenocarcinus corrosus
Stenocionops furcata
Stenocionops furcata
Stenocionops spinimana
Stenocionops spinosissima
Stenorhynchus seticornis
Stenorhynchus yangi
Symethis variolosa
Tetraxanthus rathbunae
Thalassoplax angusta
Thia scutellata – thumbnail crab
Tumidotheres maculatus
Tyche emarginata
Uca minax
Uca pugilator
Uca pugnax
Uca tangeri
Uhlias limbatus
Xaiva biguttata
Xantho hydrophilus
Xantho pilipes
Xantho poressa
Xantho sexdentatus
Zaops ostreus – oyster crab

References

Atlantic, Decapods
Crustaceans of the Atlantic Ocean
Decapods